The 1991 Banquet Frozen Foods 300 was the 12th stock car race of the 1991 NASCAR Winston Cup Series season, the third race of the 1991 NASCAR Winston West Series season, and the third iteration of the event. The race was held on Sunday, June 7, 1991, before an audience of 62,000 at the Grand Prix layout of Sears Point Raceway, a  permanent road course layout. The race took the scheduled 74 laps to complete. In the final laps of the race, Robert Yates Racing driver Davey Allison, with the assist of a late-race penalty on leader Ricky Rudd, would manage to comeback from a late-race spin to take his tenth career NASCAR Winston Cup Series victory and his second victory of the season. To fill out the top three, the aforementioned Ricky Rudd and Penske Racing South driver Rusty Wallace would finish second and third, respectively.

In what has been considered by NASCAR drivers and media as one of the most controversial rule callings in NASCAR history, Hendrick Motorsports driver Ricky Rudd was penalized after performing a bump and run maneuver on the final turn of the raceway with two laps to go in the race on leader Davey Allison. After Rudd completed his final lap, Rudd was shown the black flag instead of the checkered flag, instead showing the checkered flag to Allison to signify that Allison had won the race. Rudd, who was initially given a drive-through penalty, was given a five-second time penalty for the move on Allison for not taking the drive-through penalty, moving Rudd to a second-place finish. Rudd argued that he had both not known of the penalty and that he did not enough time to serve a penalty, who was given the black flag on the final lap of the race. According to NASCAR rules, a driver had three laps to serve their penalty. Dave Marcis, who was near the accident, would agree with Rudd, saying "How is Ricky supposed to know he got a black flag? He was up in Turn 2 or 3 by then." According to NASCAR's Vice President for Competition, Les Richter, the move that Rudd had made was "unnecessary and avoidable", a decision that which both confused and angered Rudd and his team, saying that NASCAR had never made such a decision before for a bump and run maneuver.  

Immediately after the race, Rudd and Rudd's crew chief, Waddell Wilson, would protest the results of the race. Wilson was recorded by The Charlotte Observer reporter Tom Higgins pleading to NASCAR president Bill France Jr. to change the results, saying "Don't take this race away from us, Billy!... You told all [the drivers] in the drivers' meeting that on the last lap they were on their own!" Rudd himself would compare the officiating of NASCAR officials to the World Wrestling Federation, saying that "This is the best example of how NASCAR makes their own rules. NASCAR needs a Ford in victory lane." Allison, the winner of the race, speaking in an article for The Press Democrat said "We feel like we deserve the victory, and we're going to savor it just like the rest of them."

Background 

Sears Point Raceway is one of two road courses to hold NASCAR races, the other being Watkins Glen International. The standard road course at Sears Point Raceway is a 12-turn course that is 2.52 miles (4.06 km) long; the track was modified in 1998, adding the Chute, which bypassed turns 5 and 6, shortening the course to 1.95 miles (3.14 km). The Chute was only used for NASCAR events such as this race, and was criticized by many drivers, who preferred the full layout. In 2001, it was replaced with a 70-degree turn, 4A, bringing the track to its current dimensions of 1.99 miles (3.20 km).

Entry list 

 (R) denotes rookie driver.

Qualifying 
Qualifying was split into two rounds. The first round was held on Friday, June 5, at 6:30 PM EST. Each driver would have one lap to set a time. During the first round, the top 25 drivers in the round would be guaranteed a starting spot in the race. If a driver was not able to guarantee a spot in the first round, they had the option to scrub their time from the first round and try and run a faster lap time in a second round qualifying run, held on Saturday, June 6, at 1:00 PM EST. As with the first round, each driver would have one lap to set a time. For this specific race, positions 26-40 would be decided on time, and depending on who needed it, a select amount of positions were given to cars who had not otherwise qualified but were high enough in owner's points; which was one for cars in the NASCAR Winston Cup Series and two extra provisionals for the NASCAR Winston West Series. If needed, a past champion who did not qualify on either time or provisionals could use a champion's provisional, adding one more spot to the field.

Four drivers would fail to qualify.

Full qualifying results

Race results

Standings after the race 

Drivers' Championship standings

Note: Only the first 10 positions are included for the driver standings.

References

Banquet Frozen Foods 300
Banquet Frozen Foods 300
NASCAR races at Sonoma Raceway
NASCAR controversies
June 1991 sports events in the United States